Cicada is a superfamily of insects, as well as a genus within that group; Cicada (genus).

Cicada may also refer to:

Music
Cicada (band), English electronic music group 
Cicada (Cicada album), the 2006 debut album by Cicada, and its track "Cicadas"
Cicada (Hazmat Modine album), a 2011 album by Hazmat Modine, and its title track
"Cicada", a song by Silverchair from their 1995 album Frogstomp
"Cicada", a song by La Luz from their 2018 album Floating Features
"The Cicada's Song", a song by Autopilot Off from their 2004 album Make a Sound
"Cicada," A Taiwanese modern classical/post rock artist formed in 2009

Other uses
 Cicada (comics), a villain of The Flash comic book series
 Cicada 3301, a series of cryptographic puzzles that were posted on the internet in the mid 2010s
 Cicada (mythology), several references in classical literature
 Cicada (horse) (1959–1981), an American Hall of Fame racehorse
 Cicada (film), a 2020 American film
 Cicada, an alternative spelling for Tsikada, a Russian satellite navigation system established in 1974
 Columbia Cycada, an unreleased iOS app compatibility layer for Android
 Exeirus, the Australian cicada killer wasp